Fret Nice is a 2010 platform game developed by Pieces Interactive AB and published by Tecmo Koei.  The game combines elements of side-scrolling platformers and music games, making use of a guitar controller.

References

External links
Fret Nice at Xbox.com

2010 video games
Platform games
Music video games
Xbox 360 games
Xbox 360 Live Arcade games
PlayStation 3 games
PlayStation Network games
Side-scrolling video games
Video games developed in Sweden
Pieces Interactive games